The 1967 San Francisco Giants season was the Giants' 85th year in Major League Baseball, their tenth year in San Francisco since their move from New York following the 1957 season, and their eighth at Candlestick Park. The team finished in second place in the National League with a record of 91 wins and 71 losses, 10½ games behind the NL and World Series champion St. Louis Cardinals.

Offseason 
 November 29, 1966: Hal Haydel was drafted by the Giants from the Chicago Cubs in the 1966 minor league draft.
 December 14, 1966: Len Gabrielson was traded by the Giants to the California Angels for Norm Siebern.
 January 28, 1967: Von Joshua was drafted by the Giants in the 1st round (17th pick) of the 1967 Major League Baseball draft, but did not sign.

Regular season 
 July 14, 1967: Eddie Mathews of the Atlanta Braves hit the 500th home run of his career. He hit his milestone homer off future Hall of Famer Juan Marichal of the Giants.

Season standings

Record vs. opponents

Opening Day starters 
Jesús Alou
Jim Davenport
Tom Haller
Jim Ray Hart
Ken Henderson
Hal Lanier
Juan Marichal
Willie Mays
Willie McCovey

Notable transactions 
 June 6, 1967: 1967 Major League Baseball draft
Dave Rader was drafted by the Giants in the 1st round (18th pick). Player signed June 14, 1967.
Don Carrithers was drafted by the Giants in the 3rd round.
Gary Lavelle was drafted by the Giants in the 20th round.
 June 22, 1967: Dick Groat was purchased by the Giants from the Philadelphia Phillies.
 July 15, 1967: Norm Siebern was purchased from the Giants by the Boston Red Sox.

Roster

Player stats

Batting

Starters by position 
Note: Pos = Position; G = Games played; AB = At bats; H = Hits; Avg. = Batting average; HR = Home runs; RBI = Runs batted in

Other batters 
Note: G = Games played; AB = At bats; H = Hits; Avg. = Batting average; HR = Home runs; RBI = Runs batted in

Pitching

Starting pitchers 
Note: G = Games pitched; IP = Innings pitched; W = Wins; L = Losses; ERA = Earned run average; SO = Strikeouts

Other pitchers 
Note: G = Games pitched; IP = Innings pitched; W = Wins; L = Losses; ERA = Earned run average; SO = Strikeouts

Relief pitchers 
Note: G = Games pitched; IP = Innings pitched; W = Wins; L = Losses; SV = Saves; ERA = Earned run average; SO = Strikeouts

Awards and honors 
Mike McCormick, Cy Young Award
All-Star Game

Farm system 

LEAGUE CHAMPIONS: Medford

Notes

References 
 1967 San Francisco Giants at Baseball Reference
 1967 San Francisco Giants at Baseball Almanac

San Francisco Giants seasons
San Francisco Giants season
San Fran